

Events

January events 
 January 17 – Regular train service over the Prince of Wales Bridge on the  Quebec, Montreal, Ottawa and Occidental Railway begins.

February events
 February 3 – The Seney Syndicate meets at Seney's New York bank and organized the New York, Chicago & St. Louis Railway Company (which would later become the Nickel Plate Road).
 February 16 – Canadian Pacific Railway incorporated.
 February 17 – The first train operates between Norwood, Ohio, and Lebanon, Ohio, on the Cincinnati Northern Railway.

March events 
 March 1 – The Mexican Southern Railroad is incorporated with Ulysses S. Grant, former President of the United States, as its president.
 March 8 – The Atchison, Topeka and Santa Fe Railroad, building southwestward from Kansas, reaches Deming, New Mexico.

April events
 April 13 – The New York, Chicago & St. Louis Railway Company (later known as the Nickel Plate Road) purchases the Buffalo, Cleveland & Chicago Railway
 April 14 – The Oregon Short Line Railroad is established to build a rail connection between Granger, Wyoming, and Huntington, Oregon.

May events
 May 16 – The Gross-Lichterfelde Tramway, the world's first electric tramway, is opened in Berlin by Siemens & Halske.
 May 19 – Tracks of the Southern Pacific Railroad reach El Paso, Texas.
 May 28 – A. B. Rogers on his birthday discovers the pass through the Rocky Mountains that will bear his name, Rogers Pass.

June events 
 June 9 – The Canada Central Railway is merged into the Canadian Pacific Railway.
 June 11 – The Atchison, Topeka and Santa Fe Railroad connects to El Paso, Texas.
 June 14 – Ephraim Shay takes out the first patent on his Shay locomotive design.

July events 

 July 2 – Assassination of James A. Garfield: James A. Garfield, President of the United States, is shot by lawyer Charles J. Guiteau at the Baltimore and Potomac Railroad Station in Washington, D.C., dying on September 19 of a resultant infection.
 July 4 – Darjeeling Himalayan Railway opened throughout to Darjeeling, India.
 July 6 – Kate Shelley prevents a train with 200 passengers from going over the Honey Creek Bridge after it was washed out during a flash flood near Des Moines, Iowa.
 July 26 – Construction crews on the Denver, South Park and Pacific Railroad's Alpine Tunnel, in Colorado, break through to connect both ends of the tunnel.

August events 
 August 15 – The International Exposition of Electricity opens in Paris, featuring the first tramway designed by Werner von Siemens. The installation was temporary, and removed after the Exposition closed on November 15.
 August 22 – The East Tennessee and Western North Carolina Railroad (ET&WNC) commences operation over a 14.1-mile (2.25-kilometer) run through the Appalachian Mountains.
 August 26 – The first train operates over the Red River Bridge into Winnipeg, Manitoba, Canada.

October events
 October 17 – First section of Royal Saxon State Railways narrow gauge railway ( gauge) opens, between Wilkau and Kirchberg in the German Empire.
 October 20 – First section of Barbados Railway opens on  gauge between Bridgetown and Carrington.

Unknown date events
 E.W. Clark & Co., a private banking firm in Philadelphia, purchases the Atlantic, Mississippi and Ohio Railroad (a predecessor of the Norfolk & Western) at a foreclosure auction.
 The Richmond and Danville Railroad leases the Atlanta and Charlotte Air Line Railway.
 Henry Villard becomes president of the Northern Pacific Railroad.
 The French Compagnie Universelle du Canal Interocéanique purchases a controlling interest in the Panama Railway Company.
 John Souther retires from the steam locomotive manufacturing company that he founded, Globe Locomotive Works.
 The first standard gauge railroad in China is opened from Tangshan to Xugezhuang for coal traffic.

Births

March births
 March 22 – Arturo Caprotti, Italian inventor of Caprotti valve gear for steam locomotives (d. 1938).

July births
 July 8 – Mantis James Van Sweringen, American financier who, with his brother Oris, controlled the Nickel Plate Road and other eastern railroads (d. 1935).

October births 
 October 30 – Charles E. Johnston, president of Kansas City Southern Railway 1928–1938 (d. 1951).

December births
 December 5 – Martin W. Clement, president of the Pennsylvania Railroad 1935–1948 (d. 1966).

Deaths

May deaths 
 May 21 – Thomas Alexander Scott, president of Union Pacific Railroad 1871–1872 (b. 1823).

October deaths 
 October 30 – Matthias von Schönerer, Austrian railway engineer (b. 1807).

Unknown date deaths
 William S. Hudson, superintendent of American steam locomotive manufacturing firm Rogers, Ketchum and Grosvenor (b. 1810).

References